Scruffy may refer to:


Arts and entertainment
 Scruffy (1938 film), a British film
 Scruffy (1980 film), an animated film based on the children's book Scruffy: The Tuesday Dog
 Scruffy, a 1962 novel by Paul Gallico and the title character, a Barbary ape
Scruffy (Futurama), a recurring character in the Futurama animated series
 Scruffy, the Muirs' dog in the TV series The Ghost & Mrs. Muir
 Bill "Scruffy" McGuffey, a character in the BBC children's series Grange Hill - see List of Grange Hill characters
Scruffy, a character in the Pet Alien computer-animated series
Scruffy Banister, a cat in the 1990 movie Madhouse

Other uses
 Neats vs. scruffies, in the field of artificial intelligence, a school of thought that prefers empiricism to formalism
 Scruffy, a graphical library in Ruby programming language
 Walter H. Longton (1892–1927), English First World War flying ace and later air racer
 Scruffy Wallace, Scottish-born Canadian bagpipe player and member of the punk group Dropkick Murphys